Corsedardar Hill is a mountain landform in the Grampian Mountains of Aberdeenshire, Scotland. This hill is located in the Lower Deeside region within the historic district of Kincardineshire.

See also
Strachan
Nine Stanes
Water of Feugh

References

Mountains and hills of Aberdeenshire
Grampian